The 2020-21 World Surf League is the 44th season of all iterations of the tour circuit for professional surfers. After the 2020 season was cancelled due to the COVID-19 pandemic, limiting international travel between and within countries namely Australia, Indonesia, Portugal and South Africa. The board changed the tour to a wraparound season of 2020-21, which allowed major changes to the tour schedule, with the Billabong Pipe Masters becoming the first round of the tour.

The season also saw some new events introduced due to COVID-19 outbreaks and restrictions on travel within countries, notably Australia, who required surfers to quarantine in Sydney for 14 days upon arrival. Narrabeen was chosen as a replacement for the Gold Coast, while Newcastle returned to the tour for the first time in 10 years to replace Bells Beach. The women's championship tour will compete in Teahupo'o, French Polynesia for the first time in 15 years, while Mexico was added to the championship for the first time to replace the round left vacant by Jeffrey's Bay, due to the COVID outbreak in South Africa.

For the first time, the season will end at Lower Trestles, in San Clemente, USA, with the top five seeded men and women from the season going head to head to determine the champion at the WSL Finals. This was put in place after the positive response to the men's championship event in 2019, as well as allowing surfers who had to isolate with COVID-19 an opportunity to still win the title.

Carissa Moore and Ítalo Ferreira are the defending champions.

Schedule 
The championship series will consist of the following events, subject to change due to the COVID-19 pandemic.

Results and Standings

Event Results

Men's Standings 
Points are awarded using the following structure:

Women's Standings 
Points are awarded using the following structure:

References

External links

World Surf League
World Surf League